Proszynskiana is a genus of Asian jumping spiders that was first described by D. V. Logunov in 1996. It is named in honor of arachnologist Jerzy Prószyński.

Taxonomy
In Maddison's 2015 classification of the family Salticidae, Proszynskiana is placed in the tribe Aelurillini, part of the Salticoida clade of the subfamily Salticinae.

Species
 it contains seven species, found in Siberia, Tajikistan, Iran, Turkmenistan, and Uzbekistan:
Proszynskiana aeluriforma Logunov & Rakov, 1998 – Uzbekistan
Proszynskiana deserticola Logunov, 1996 – Kazakhstan
Proszynskiana iranica Logunov, 1996 – Turkmenistan
Proszynskiana izadii Azarkina & Zamani, 2019 – Iran
Proszynskiana logunovi Azarkina & Zamani, 2019 – Iran
Proszynskiana starobogatovi Logunov, 1996 (type) – Tajikistan
Proszynskiana zonshteini Logunov, 1996 – Turkmenistan

References

Salticidae genera
Salticidae
Spiders of Asia